Concertino is the diminutive of concerto, thus literally a small or short concerto.

Examples
Listed by composer:
Hendrik Andriessen:
Concertino for oboe and string orchestra (1970)
Concertino for cello and chamber orchestra (1970)
Jurriaan Andriessen:
Concertino for bassoon and winds (1962) 
Concertino for piano and orchestra (1962)
Concertino for sousaphone and orchestra (1967)
Alexander Arutiunian: Concertino for piano and orchestra (1951)
Kees van Baaren: Concertino for piano and orchestra (1934)
Henk Badings: Concertino for piano trio (violin, cello, and piano) and chamber orchestra (1942)
Marion Bauer: Concertino for oboe, clarinet, and string quartet, Op. 32b
Luciano Berio: Concertino for clarinet, violin, celesta, harp, and strings (1949, rev. 1951 and 1970)
Henriëtte Bosmans: Concertino for piano and orchestra (1929)
Ferrucio Busoni: , BV 276 (Op. 48)
Cécile Chaminade: Concertino for flute and orchestra in D major
Ferdinand David: Trombone Concertino
Hossein Dehlavi: Concertino for santur and orchestra
Gaetano Donizetti: Concertino in G Major for cor anglais and orchestra (1817)
Theodore Eisfeld: Concertino for clarinet and orchestra
David Farquhar: Concertino for piano and strings (1960)
Lorenzo Ferrero: 
Three Baroque Buildings, concertino for trumpet, bassoon and string orchestra (1997)
Rastrelli in Saint Petersburg, concertino for oboe and string orchestra (2000) 
Two Cathedrals in the South, concertino for trumpet and string orchestra (2001)
Guarini, the Master, concertino for violin and string orchestra (2004)
Wolfgang Fortner: Concertino for viola and chamber orchestra (1934)
Jean Françaix:
Concertino for piano and orchestra (1932)
Concertino for violin and orchestra (1954)
Roberto Gerhard: Concertino for strings (1927–28)
Peggy Glanville-Hicks:
Concertino da camera for flute, clarinet, bassoon, and piano (1945)
Concertino antico for harp and string quartet (1955)
Michael Haydn: Concertino for trumpet and orchestra
Hans Werner Henze: Concertino for piano, winds, and percussion (1947)
Paul Hindemith: Concertino (or: Konzertstück) for trautonium and strings (1931)
Gilad Hochman: Concertino for string orchestra and flute obbligato (2003)
Jacques Ibert: Concertino da camera
John Ireland: Concertino pastorale for string orchestra (1939)
Leoš Janáček: Concertino for piano and chamber ensemble
André Jolivet: 
Julius Klengel: Concertino for cello in C major
István Láng:
Concertino for xylophone and orchestra (1961, rev. 1967)
Concertino for soprano, trumpet, harp, violin, viola, cello, and electronics
Lars-Erik Larsson:
Concertino No. 1 for flute and strings, Op. 45 No. 1 (1955)
Concertino No. 2 for oboe and strings, Op. 45 No. 2 (1955)
Concertino No. 3 for clarinet and strings, Op. 45 No. 3 (1957)
Concertino No. 4 for bassoon and strings, Op. 45 No. 4 (1955)
Concertino No. 5 for horn and strings, Op. 45 No. 5 (1955)
Concertino No. 6 for trumpet and strings, Op. 45 No. 6 (1953)
Concertino No. 7 for trombone and strings, Op. 45 No. 7 (1955)
Concertino No. 8 for violin and strings, Op. 45 No. 8 (1956)
Concertino No. 9 for viola and strings, Op. 45 No. 9 (1956)
Concertino No. 10 for cello and strings, Op. 45 No. 10 (1956)
Concertino No. 11 for double bass and strings, Op. 45 No. 11 (1957)
Concertino No. 12 for piano and strings, Op. 45 No. 12 (1957)
Walter Leigh: Concertino for Harpsichord and String Orchestra
Ursula Mamlok: Concertino for wind quintet, string orchestra, and percussion
Bohuslav Martinů: 
Concertino for cello and chamber ensemble (piccolo, 2 oboes, clarinet, bassoon, horn, trumpet, trombone, piano, timpani, drum, and cymbals) (1924)
Concertino for piano left hand and chamber orchestra (1926)
Concertino for piano trio and strings, H. 231 (1933)
Concertino for piano trio and strings, H. 232 (1933)
Concertino for piano and orchestra (1938)
Darius Milhaud: Les quatre saisons:
Concertino de printemps for violin and chamber orchestra, Op. 135 (1934)
Concertino d'automne for two pianos and eight instruments, Op. 309 (1951)
Concertino d'été for viola and chamber orchestra, Op. 311 (1951)
Concertino d'hiver for trombone and string orchestra, Op. 327 (1953)
Per Nørgård: Concertino No. 2 for piano solo (1950)
Léon Orthel: Concertino alla burla for piano and orchestra, Op. 12 (1930)
Vincent Persichetti: Concertino for piano and orchestra, Op. 16 (1941)
Walter Piston: Concertino for piano and chamber orchestra (1937)
Francis Poulenc: Concertino for piano four-hands (1931)
Sergei Prokofiev: Cello Concertino
Marcel Quinet:
Concertino for flute and orchestra (1959)
Concertino for oboe, clarinet, bassoon, and orchestra (1960)
Concertino for violin and orchestra (1970)
Ned Rorem:
Concertino de Camera for harpsichord and small ensemble (1946)
Albert Roussel: 
Gunther Schuller: Concertino for jazz quartet (vibraphone, piano, percussion, and double bass) and orchestra (1959)
Roger Sessions: Concertino for chamber orchestra (1971–72)
Dmitri Shostakovich: Concertino for two pianos, Op. 94 (1954)
Nikos Skalkottas: 
Concertino for solo oboe with piano accompaniment (1939)
Concertino for trumpet with piano accompaniment (190–42)
Concertino for piano and orchestra in C major (1948)
Concertino for two pianos and orchestra (1935)
Richard Strauss: Duett-Concertino for clarinet, bassoon, strings and harp (1947)
Igor Stravinsky: Concertino for string quartet (1920), also arrs. for piano four-hands, and for flute, oboe, cor anglais, clarinet, 2 bassons, 2 trumpets, 2 trombones, violin, and cello
Carlos Surinach:
Concertino for piano, stings, and cymbals (1956)
Doppio Concertino for violin, piano, and nine instruments (1954)
 Germaine Tailleferre:
 
 
Virgil Thomson: Autumn, concertino for harp, strings, and percussion (1964)
Erich Urbanner: Concertino for flute and orchestra (1959)
Václav Jindřich Veit: Concertino for violin and orchestra, Op. 25 (1844)
Carl Maria von Weber: 
Concertino in E-flat major for clarinet and orchestra, Op. 26, J. 109 (1811)
Concertino in E minor for horn and orchestra, Op. 45
 Konzertstück in F minor for Piano and Orchestra, Op. 79
Ermanno Wolf-Ferrari:
Idillio-concertino in A major for oboe, two horns, and strings, Op. 15 (1933)
Suite-concertino in F major for bassoon, two horns, and strings, Op. 16 (1933)
Concertino in A major for cor anglais, two horns, and strings, Op. 34 (1947)
Arthur Wood: Concertino in A major for flute and orchestra (1948)
Isang Yun: Concertino for accordion and string quartet (1983)

References